Russkaya Zhizn (Русская жизнь, Russian Life) was a Left-Cadet legal daily, published in St. Petersburg, Russia, from January 14, 1907. On February 27, from its thirty-eighth issue, the newspaper was taken over by the Mensheviks; its contributors included Pavel Axelrod, F. I. Dan, V. I. Zasulich, L. Martov, G.V. Plekhanov. The newspaper was banned on March 15, 1907.

References

Newspapers published in the Russian Empire
Newspapers published in Russia
Mass media in Saint Petersburg
1907 establishments in the Russian Empire
1907 disestablishments
ru:Русская жизнь (журнал)